Sylvie Patin (born Sylvie Gache-Patin on 11 June 1951) is a French conservator-restorer of cultural heritage at Musée d'Orsay and art historian specialised in Impressionism.

Career 
Sylvie Patin was born on 11 June 1951. She has a degree in historical geography and a master's degree in history at the Paris Nanterre University, then she joined École du Louvre to continue her study.

She did a museum internship at the Musée Marmottan Monet in 1972 and passed the competitive examination of the musées de France in 1973. From 1974 to 1975, she was a trainee curator at Galerie nationale du Jeu de Paume and Musée de l'Orangerie, then a full-time curator from 1976 to 1980. She became curator of the Musée d'Orsay in 1980, chief curator in 1991, and finally a general curator in 2006. She retired in 2016.

In 2010, Patin curated an exhibition of Monet at the Grand Palais. On 20 September 2020, Patin was invited to a  based on her book . The meeting was organised in a former florist shop at the Place de l'Église of Illiers-Combray, during a book fair held in the commune.

Publications 
 Publications by Patin
 In the Country: 19th Century Musée d’Orsay, Éditions Hazan, 1986
 Monet : « un œil... mais, bon Dieu, quel œil ! », collection « Découvertes Gallimard » (nº 131), série Arts. Éditions Gallimard, 1991, new edition in 2010
 Monet: The Ultimate Impressionist, ‘New Horizons’ series, Thames & Hudson, 1993 (UK edition)
 Monet: The Ultimate Impressionist, “Abrams Discoveries” series. Harry N. Abrams, 1993 (U.S. edition)
 Impression... impressionnisme, collection « Découvertes Gallimard Texto » (nº 4). Éditions Gallimard, 1998
 L’impressionnisme, La Bibliothèque des Arts, 2002
 Claude Monet au musée d’Orsay, RMN, 2004
 Le Musée intime de Monet à Giverny, Éditions Gourcuff Gradenigo, 2016
 Monet’s Private Picture Gallery at Giverny, Éditions Gourcuff Gradenigo, 2016
 In collaboration
 With Anne Distel & Michel Hoog, L’impressionnisme au musée du Jeu de Paume, F. Hazan, 1977
 AA.VV., Monet (Grand Palais Paris exhibition catalogue): 1840–1926, Harry N. Abrams, 2010

References

External links 
  
 Bibliographie de Sylvie Patin at her official website 

1951 births
Living people
Curators from Paris
French art critics
French women art critics
École du Louvre alumni
Chevaliers of the Légion d'honneur
Chevaliers of the Ordre des Palmes Académiques
Officiers of the Ordre des Arts et des Lettres
French women curators